Jianyuan may refer to:

Remonstrance Bureau, a government agency during the Song and Jurchen Jin dynasties

Historical eras
Jianyuan (140BC–135BC), era name used by Emperor Wu of Han
Jianyuan (315–316), era name used by Liu Cong (Han Zhao), emperor of Former Zhao
Jianyuan (343–344), era name used by Emperor Kang of Jin
Jianyuan (365–385), era name used by Fu Jian (337–385), emperor of Former Qin
Jianyuan (479–482), era name used by Emperor Gao of Southern Qi